SS Culross was a 7,331 ton cargo ship  which was built as Empire Antigua in 1945. She was renamed Culross in 1946. In 1960 she was renamed Akastos, serving under a number of flags until 1968 when she was renamed Marina, being scrapped in that year.

History
Empire Antelope was built by Shipbuilding Corporation Ltd, Newcastle upon Tyne as yard number 12. She was launched on 20 November 1945 and completed in February 1946. Empire Antelope was built for the Ministry of War Transport and managed by Dodd, Thompson & Co Ltd. In 1946, she was sold to the South Georgia Company, and renamed Culross She operated under the management of Christian Salvesen Ltd, Leith. In 1958, she was laid up at Gairloch. In 1960, Culross was sold to Navigazione y de Comercio Apolo Ltda, Lebanon and renamed Akastos. In 1961 she was reflagged to Greece. She was operated under the management of N J Vlassopulous, London between 1960 and 1966 when she was reflagged to Cyprus and management was transferred to Aegis Shipping Ltd, London. In 1967, Akastos was sold to the Blue Cross Transocean Co, Athens. She was renamed Marina in 1967 and scrapped in Hamburg later that year, arriving on 4 August 1968

Official Number and code letters
Official Numbers were a forerunner to IMO Numbers.

Empire Antigua and Culross used the UK Official Number 169207. Empire Antigua used Code Letters GDTB.

References

1945 ships
Ships built on the River Tyne
Steamships of the United Kingdom
Merchant ships of the United Kingdom
Empire ships
Ministry of War Transport ships
Steamships of Lebanon
Merchant ships of Lebanon
Steamships of Greece
Cargo ships of Greece
Steamships of Cyprus
Merchant ships of Cyprus